Secularization is the confiscation of church property by a government, such as in the suppression of monasteries. The term is often used to specifically refer to such confiscations during the French Revolution and the First French Empire in the sense of seizing churches and converting their property to state ownership.

Examples of Secularization in History

Dissolution of the Monasteries in England 
The Dissolution of the Monasteries in England began in 1536 under Henry VIII of England.  While some monasteries were simply abolished, and their property retained by the Crown or by the King's favorites, others remained in the Church of England as collegiate foundations, including cathedrals and royal peculiars, staffed by secular clergy.

Ecclesiastical confiscations of Mendizábal in Spain 
The Ecclesiastical confiscations of Mendizábal: Spanish (desamortización eclesiástica de Mendizábal). This is referred to as la Desamortización in colloquial Spanish.

The confiscations refer to a February 1836 decree for the Desamortización declared by Juan Álvarez Mendizábal. He was prime minister at the time of the release of the decree.

The Spanish government confiscated the property because they felt that the property was underused by the monasteries. The government saw this land as a perfect opportunity to gain wealth and increase the holdings of the nobility. The churches were not compensated for their property and were taken. Many middlemen were involved in the acquisition of the properties because the church excommunicated the auctioneers and buyers. In order for the transaction to go through to obtain the property, they had to use a third-party individual.

The confiscations took place at the same time as the First Carlist War, of which there were three. The Carlist Wars were a series of civil wars in the 19th century involving Liberal-Republican factions who wanted a secular and modern government. In contrast, the traditional Carlist faction wanted to preserve ancient traditions and royalty.

Josephinism in Austria: as part of his enlightened absolutism, Joseph II, Holy Roman Emperor seized several monasteries before the French Revolution, leaving only 388 of the 915 monasteries (of which 762 were male institutions and 153 female ones) existing in Austria in 1780. 
Josephinism in Austria refers to the actions of Joseph II, Holy Roman Emperor, and the transformation of the Catholic Church as subservient to the monarchy. Enlightened absolutism was a concept that spread across Continental Europe, separating church and state and putting the authority of the state out of the hands of the church. Several monasteries were seized before the French Revolution.

The French Revolution brought about a period of extremity and conflict among traditional royalists, and enlightened liberals. Joseph II had a strong aversion for monasteries that he viewed as not contributing positively to society, although he was a Catholic. Upwards of 500 out of 1,188 monasteries in Austria were taken, and 60 million florins were taken by the state. 1700 new parishes and welfare institutions were created from this wealth and property.

German mediatization (German: deutsche Mediatisierung): incorporation of ecclesiastical principalities and territories of the former Holy Roman Empire into larger secular territorial states. 
German mediatization refers to the restructuring of German territory between 1802 and 1814 of the former Holy Roman Emperor into 39 German states, from the original 300 states and principalities. Many properties and buildings owned by the Church were confiscated and reallocated through this process. Monasteries, land, property titles, and authority were stripped from the princes and religious leaders of these German states.

The pressure of German Mediatization was not initiated by the Germans themselves, but rather by the diplomatic pressure by Napoleon and the French military

The legislation that brought about the German mediatization is known as The Final Recess of the Imperial Deputation (German: Reichsdeputationshauptschluss) of 25 February 1803.

This law brought about the property restructuring of the Holy Roman Empire. By reallocating the ecclesiastical states and the imperial cities to other imperial estates, they were able to satisfy Napoleon's demands and bring about increased secularisation.

Secularization of monastic estates in Romania 
The Secularization of Monastic Estates in Romania refers to the confiscation of large estates owned and operated by the Eastern Orthodox Church in Romania. The land confiscated was utilized for land reform and agriculture. By confiscating monastery lands, the boyars of Romania were able to keep their estates intact while still developing the infrastructure of Romania.

The law that enacted the secularization of monastic estates in Romania was approved by the Parliament of Romania and brought about in December 1863 by Domnitor Alexandru Ioan Cuza.

Romania was then known as the Romanian United Principalities.

The monasteries were untaxed and as they composed ¼ of Romania's land, the inability to tax these lands and the Church's ownership had negative effects on the state's ability to generate revenue.

Relevant Media 
Secularization of Bavaria on Bayern 2 radioWissen

Etymology 
The Latin term saecularisatio was already used in 1559 and used as a verb in 1586.

“Saecularisatio” did not refer to the confiscation of property of churches at this time; “profanatio sacrae rei” was used instead to refer to this definition of secularization, referring to church property.

Literature 
 Marcel Albert: The commemorative events for the 200th anniversary of secularization 1803–2003. A critical review . In: Roman Quarterly, 100, 2005, pp. 240–274.
 Christian Bartz: The secularization of Laach Abbey in 1802. A case study. In: Rhenish Quarterly Journals, 62, 1998, pp. 238–307.
 Paul Fabianek: Consequences of secularization for the monasteries in the Rhineland. Using the example of the Schwarzenbroich and Kornelimünster monasteries. Books on Demand, 2012,  .
 Reiner Groß : History of Saxony. Berlin 2001 (4th edition 2012).
 Volker Himmelein (ed.): Old monasteries, new masters. The secularization in the German south-west in 1803. Large State Exhibition of Baden-Württemberg 2003 . Thorbecke, Ostfildern 2003,  (exhibition catalog and essay volume).
 Georg Mölich, Joachim Oepen, Wolfgang Rosen (eds.): Monastery culture and secularization in the Rhineland. Klartext Verlag, Essen 2002,  .
 Isa Lübbers, Martin Rößler, Joachim Stüben (eds.): Secularization - a world-historical process in Hamburg. Peter Lang, Frankfurt am Main 2017,  .
 Winfried Müller : A Bavarian special way? Secularization in Germany on the left and right banks of the Rhine. In: Alois Schmid (ed.): The secularization in Bavaria 1803. Culture break or modernization? CH Beck, Munich 2003, pp. 317–334.
 Winfried Müller: The Secularization of 1803 . In: Walter Brandmüller (ed.): Handbook of Bavarian church history. Volume 3. Eos Verlag, St. Ottilien 1991, pp. 1–84.
 Winfried Müller: Between secularization and concordat. The Reorganization of Church-State Relations 1803–1821 . In: Walter Brandmüller (ed.): Handbook of Bavarian church history. Volume 3. Eos Verlag, St. Ottilien 1991, pp. 85–129.
 Alfons Maria Scheglmann : History of secularization in Bavaria on the right bank of the Rhine. 3 volumes. Habbel, Regensburg 1903–1908.
 Rudolf Schlögl : Belief and religion in secularization. The Catholic City - Cologne, Aachen, Munster - 1740–1840. Munich 1995.
 Dietmar Stutzer: Secularization 1803. The storming of Bavaria's churches and monasteries. Rosenheimer Verlagshaus Alfred Förg, 1976,  .
 Hermann Uhrig: The compatibility of Art. VII of the Peace of Lunéville with the Imperial Constitution . 5 volumes, Verlag Traugott Bautz, Nordhausen 2014,  ; 2789 p. (at the same time expanded Jur. Diss. Tübingen 2011, urn : nbn:de:bsz:21-opus-56749 ).
 Eberhard Weis : Montgelas . First volume. Between Revolution and Reform 1759–1799 . 2nd Edition. Beck, Munich 1988,  .
 Matthias Wemhoff : Secularization and new beginnings . Schnell & Steiner, Regensburg 2007,  (on the occasion of the opening of the exhibition in the Regional Association of Westphalia-Lippe-State Museum for Monastery Culture in Dalheim Monastery ).

See also 
 
 
 
 
 
 Laicism
 Monasteries
England
 List of monasteries dissolved by Henry VIII of England
 Henry VIII
 Catherine Aragon
 Anne Boleyn
France
 French Revolution
 Napoleon
Holy Roman Empire
 Joseph II Holy Roman Emperor
Spain
 Spanish confiscation
 Anticlericalism in Spain
 Confiscations of Madoz
 Carlist Wars
 Juan Álvarez Mendizábal

Bibliography
 Marcel Albert: Die Gedenkveranstaltungen zum 200. Jahrestag der Säkularisation 1803–2003. Ein kritischer Rückblick, in: Römische Quartalschrift 100 (2005) S. 240–274.

16th century in the Holy Roman Empire
17th century in the Holy Roman Empire
19th century in Germany
16th century in England
18th century in France
19th century in France
18th century in Austria